The Silent Witness is a 1932 American mystery film directed by Marcel Varnel and starring Lionel Atwill, Greta Nissen and Helen Mack. It was adapted from a play by Jack DeLeon and Jack Celestin. The film's sets were designed by the art director Duncan Cramer who worked on many Fox Film productions of the era.

Synopsis
A London courtroom drama in which an Englishman takes the blame for his son who he believes guilty of murdering his lover. The real truth surrounding the case is only revealed by a silent witness.

Cast
 Lionel Atwill as Sir Austin Howard
 Greta Nissen as Nora Selmer
 Weldon Heyburn as Carl Blake
 Helen Mack as Sylvia Pierce
 Bramwell Fletcher as Anthony Howard
 Mary Forbes as Lady Howard
 C. Montague Shaw as Inspector Robbins 
 Wyndham Standing as Sir John Lawson, Barrister
 Alan Mowbray as Arthur Drinton
 Herbert Mundin as Henry Hammer
 Billy Bevan as Horace Ward
 Lumsden Hare as Colonel Grayson

References

Bibliography
 Goble, Alan. The Complete Index to Literary Sources in Film. Walter de Gruyter, 1999.
 Turim, Maureen. Flashbacks in Film: Memory & History. Routledge, 2013.

External links

1932 films
American mystery films
Films directed by Marcel Varnel
Fox Film films
1932 mystery films
American films based on plays
American black-and-white films
1932 directorial debut films
Films set in London
1930s English-language films
1930s American films